, provisional designation , is a trans-Neptunian object and cubewano from the Kuiper belt, located in the outermost region of the Solar System. It was discovered on 12 April 2011, by astronomers with the Pan-STARRS survey at Haleakala Observatory, Hawaii, United States.

Orbit and classification 

 orbits the Sun at a distance of 40.9–44.8 AU once every 280 years and 4 months (102,379 days; semi-major axis of 42.83 AU). Its orbit has an eccentricity of 0.05 and an inclination of 24° with respect to the ecliptic. It has an orbital uncertainty of 1–2. The object's observation arc begins with a precovery taken by the Sloan Digital Sky Survey in March 2002, 9 years prior to its official discovery observation at Haleakala Observatory in March 2011.

 is a cubewano, a classical, low-eccentricity object in the Kuiper belt, located in between the two prominent resonant populations of the plutinos and twotinos. Due to its relatively high inclination, this cubewano belongs to the "stirred" hot population rather than to the larger cold population.

Numbering and naming 

This minor planet was numbered by the Minor Planet Center on 25 September 2018 and received the number  in the minor planet catalog. As of 2018, it has not been named.

Physical characteristics 

According to the American astronomer Michael Brown,  measures 358 kilometers in diameter based on an assumed albedo of 0.08. On his website, Michael Brown lists this object as a "possible" dwarf planet (200–400 km), which is the category with the lowest certainty in his 5-class taxonomic system. Similarly, Johnston's archive estimates a diameter 352 kilometers using an albedo of 0.09. As of 2018, no spectral type and color indices, nor a rotational lightcurve have been obtained from spectroscopic and photometric observations. The body's color, rotation period, pole and shape remain unknown.

References

External links 
 List of Transneptunian Objects, Minor Planet Center
 Discovery Circumstances: Numbered Minor Planets (520001)-(525000) – Minor Planet Center
 
 

523687
523687
523687
20100313